Parween Habib is a Bahraini journalist and poet who hosts the weekly talk show Helw Elkalam on Dubai TV. She also presents the weekly talk show We Meet Parween Habib on the same channel.

Biography	
She was born Parvin Habib. She writes poetry and researches creativity and spirituality. Born in Manama, she has a Bachelor of Arts , Master of Arts, and doctorate in Arabic literature. She has published a poetry collection and a critical study entitled تقنيات التعبير في شعر نزار قباني (“Expressive Techniques in the Poetry of Nizar Qabbani”). She made her broadcasting debut in 1988.

References

Bahraini television personalities
Bahraini poets
Bahraini women poets
1969 births
Living people